The Play-offs of the 2003 Fed Cup Europe/Africa Zone Group II were the final stages of the Group II Zonal Competition involving teams from Europe and Africa. Those that qualified for this stage placed first and second in their respective pools.

The four teams were then randomly paired up the team from a different placing of another group for a play-off tie, with the winners being promoted to Group II.

Lithuania vs. Portugal

  promoted to Group I for 2004, where they were 13th overall and then relegated to Group II for 2005.

Greece vs. Finland

  advanced to Group I for 2004, where they came eleventh overall.

See also
Fed Cup structure

References

External links
 Fed Cup website

2003 Fed Cup Europe/Africa Zone